Sedef Köktentürk (born 22 July 1974) is a Turkish former windsurfer, who specialized in the RS:X class. She was the country's top female windsurfer for the 2008 Summer Olympics, finishing last of the 27-woman fleet. Outside competitive sailing, Köktentürk worked in the investment management division at Goldman Sachs for seven years, before currently taking a directorial role at Generation Investment Management in London.

Köktentürk competed for the Turkish sailing squad, as a lone female, in the inaugural women's RS:X class at the 2008 Summer Olympics in Beijing. Building up to her Olympic selection, she formally accepted a berth forfeited by Germany, as the next highest-ranked windsurfer vying for qualification, at the class-associated Worlds nearly eight months earlier in Auckland, New Zealand. Köktentürk clearly struggled to catch a large fleet of windsurfers from behind under breezy conditions with marks lower than the top 20 and an unanticipated eighth-leg exit at the end of ten-race series, sitting her in last with 232 net points.

References

External links
 
 
 
 

1974 births
Living people
Turkish female sailors (sport)
Turkish windsurfers
Olympic sailors of Turkey
Sailors at the 2008 Summer Olympics – RS:X
Sportspeople from İzmir
Female windsurfers